"Sweet Dreams" is a song by British-Norwegian DJ Alan Walker and Kazakh Imanbek, released as a single on 11 June 2021. The song samples the Scatman John track "Scatman (Ski-Ba-Bop-Ba-Dop-Bop)" and was a hit in both Norway and Sweden.
A remix contest of "Sweet Dreams" was launched in partnership of Alan Walker and the digital workstation, FL Studio.

Music video
The music video was released on Alan Walker's channel on 11 June 2021. It shows two car racers racing in a desert landscape. The music video currently has over 19.5 million views.

Remixes
The two producers also released a remix package titled Sweet Dreams Remixes that contained the following tracks:

"Sweet Dreams" (with Alok)
"Sweet Dreams" (Brooks Remix)
"Sweet Dreams" (Curbi Remix)
"Sweet Dreams" (Mari Ferrari & Rompasso Remix)
"Sweet Dreams" (Albert Vishi)
"Sweet Dreams" (DES3ETT Remix)

Charts

Weekly charts

Year-end charts

Certifications

References

2021 singles
2021 songs
Alan Walker (music producer) songs
Imanbek songs